The 2007 US Open was held from 27 August to 9 September 2007, at USTA Billie Jean King National Tennis Center at Flushing Meadows, New York City.

Roger Federer successfully defended his title, becoming the first man in the open era to win four consecutive US Open titles. Maria Sharapova was unsuccessful in defending her 2006 title, being upset in the third round by 18-year-old Agnieszka Radwańska of Poland. Justine Henin, the runner-up to Sharapova in 2006, won her second US Open title, this year without losing a set. It was the second Grand Slam she won in the year without losing a set, having also won the 2007 French Open earlier in the year. It was also her last Grand Slam title.

Timeline

Notable stories

Player of the day
Player of the day were:
 Day 1:  Donald Young for winning his first Grand Slam match over  Chris Guccione.
 Day 2:  Arnaud Clément for defeating someone over a foot taller than him.
 Day 3:  Robby Ginepri for showing older form in his match against  Olivier Rochus, winning a set in only 20 minutes.
 Day 4:  Andy Murray for winning a five set match against  Jonas Björkman, returning to top form found earlier on.
 Day 5:  Ana Ivanovic for playing superb tennis in her matches and not dropping a set.
 Day 6:  Agnieszka Radwańska for causing the upset of the tournament in defeating defending women's singles champion  Maria Sharapova.
 Day 7:  David Ferrer for staying strong to defeat  David Nalbandian.
 Day 8:  Shahar Pe'er for becoming the first Israeli player to make the quarterfinals of the US Open.
 Day 9:  Carlos Moyà for, despite his age, reaching the US Open quarterfinals in a match where he displayed his veteran style of play.
 Day 10:  Anna Chakvetadze for reaching the first Grand Slam semifinal of her career.
 Day 11:  Victoria Azarenka for winning the mixed doubles title.
 Day 12:  Svetlana Kuznetsova for reaching her second US Open final.
 Day 13:  Novak Djokovic for reaching his and Serbia's first (men's) Grand Slam final.
 Day 14:  Roger Federer for winning his 12th career Grand Slam and 4th consecutive U.S Open title.

Important matches
 Rafael Nadal, seeded and ranked second, was tested by Alun Jones, who broke him in the first set before Nadal came back to break back and take the set 7–5. Jones, however, won the second set 6–3, and Nadal, more at ease, won the next two sets, finally advancing, 7–5, 3–6, 6–4, 6–1.
 Donald Young won his first Grand Slam match against Chris Guccione in four sets.
 Fernando Verdasco rallied in coming from two sets down to defeat Paul-Henri Mathieu, the 22nd seed. Verdasco was ahead 5–1 in the third set and 5–3 in the final set. He won a dramatic game and thus match in the fifth set.
 Daniela Hantuchová lost 6–4, 3–6, 6–1 to Julia Vakulenko, becoming the first top ten seed to exit the tournament.
 Teymuraz Gabashvili defeated No. 7 Fernando González in round 1 in 5 sets, having let sets 3 and 4 slip away, before rebounding 6–4 in the 5th.
 Ahsha Rolle continued her run at the 2007 US Open after coming from a set and a break down to defeat Italian Karin Knapp.
 James Blake defeated Fabrice Santoro 6–4, 3–6, 6–2, 4–6, 6–4 to achieve his first ever victory in a match that went to 5 sets, having gone 0–9 previously. He saved 3 break points at 4–4 in the final set.
 Novak Djokovic defeated Radek Štěpánek in five sets, where neither player won a set with a score of 6 games—Djokovic won the match 6–7 (4), 7–6 (5), 5–7, 7–5, 7–6 (2). After his victory, Djokovic fell to the ground and the players embraced each other. The match lasted four hours, 44 minutes and 63 games, equalling a record set in 1979.
 Maria Sharapova, the defending champion, was dumped out in the third round by Polish teenager Agnieszka Radwańska. After losing the first set, Sharapova responded by winning the second, 6–1. However, Radwańska was undeterred and broke Sharapova thrice in the final set, 6–2. This was the first time the number 2 women's seed had lost before Round 4 since Andrea Jaeger in 1981.
 Roger Federer defeated John Isner, making a run of 105 consecutive points without an unforced error during the second and third sets.
 Tommy Haas beat James Blake, 4–6, 6–4, 3–6, 6–0, 7–6 (4), despite winning 7 straight games and broke Blake in his first  service game in the fifth set. Blake broke back and eventually had match points, but Haas saved them and had three match points. The first was saved by Blake with an in call that Haas incorrectly lost a Chase review. Blake went on to challenge, but the call was in and Haas won the match. Haas also was ahead in the tiebreak, but Blake edged back until Haas was ahead and won the match.
 Roger Federer was a set down, but came to set up a showdown with Andy Roddick in the quarterfinals, beating Feliciano López, 3–6, 6–4, 6–1, 6–4. Towards the end of the match, Federer won 35 consecutive points on serve.
 David Ferrer beat No. 2 seed Rafael Nadal 6–7(3), 6–4, 7–6(4), 6–2 in a match that finished at 1:51 a.m. local time. This was the third latest finish in US Open history. Ferrer admitted to having a McDonald's meal afterwards. The match itself lasted 3hrs, 28mins and was preceded by the Justine Henin–Serena Williams tie.
 Roger Federer went past Andy Roddick in the quarterfinals, in straight sets with the score 7–6, 7–6, 6–2 to set up a semi-final clash with Nikolay Davydenko.
 Justine Henin defeated Venus Williams 7–6 (2), 6–4 to reach the final. This match marked the first time since 2001 (Martina Hingis; Australian Open) that someone had defeated both Williams sisters in the same tournament. Henin has yet to lose a set on her way to the final.
 Novak Djokovic reached his first Grand Slam final, and in doing so became the first Serbian man to become a Grand Slam finalist. He beat David Ferrer 6–4, 6–4, 6–3.

Day-by-day summaries

Qualifying day 1
Qualifying was impossible due to rain.

Qualifying day 2
Qualifying Day 2 saw much rain. However, according to this link, players such as Emmanuelle Gagliardi, Pablo Cuevas, Jamie Baker, Steve Darcis, Alina Jidkova and Aisam-ul-Haq Qureshi were winners to the following round of qualifying. In addition, main singles draws for men and women were released, except qualifiers' names; however the draw shows where qualifiers will go. Roger Federer, seeded first, will play a qualifier for the first two rounds, and possibly three consecutive rounds.

Qualifying day 3
The first round of qualifying was completed and second round matches began. In-form Frank Dancevic came through in the men's draw; whilst 2007 French Open Girls' Singles champion Alizé Cornet came through in the women's qualifying.

Qualifying day 4
Players began qualifying for the main draw; the first on the men's side being Pablo Cuevas and the first on the women's, Renata Voráčová. Scoville Jenkins was the first American qualifier to reach the main draw.

Qualifying day 5
Qualifying was completed as Dancevic, Rainer Schüttler and Andrei Pavel qualified among others such as Bruno Echagaray, who beat Robin Haase. On the women's side Cornet and Andreja Klepač came through, along with Julia Görges, who upset No. 6 seed Anne Kremer.

Kids Day

Coverage found on CBS or possibly other channels: Matches, songs and other events were held and played at the 2007 US Open Kids Day. Matches were held; including with non-professional tennis players Rob Thomas, Tony Hawk and John Cena, along with others who competed in non-match activities.

Day 1

Day 1 saw Feliciano López was able to upset Juan Carlos Ferrero, 6–3, 6–4, 6–4. Max Mirnyi defeated Marcos Baghdatis  6–3, 7–5, 3–6, 7–6 (6), in an epic battle in which Mirnyi came back in the last-set tiebreaker from 1–5 to win 8–6. Both Venus Williams and Serena Williams continued runs, however young qualifier Alizé Cornet stunned Samantha Stosur. Wildcard talent John Isner played four sets and defeated the seeded Jarkko Nieminen. Guillermo Cañas needed four sets to beat Rubén Ramírez Hidalgo, while Fernando Verdasco came back to shock the crowd from two sets to love down to beat Paul-Henri Mathieu, 1–6, 3–6, 6–4, 6–3, 6–3. Julia Görges lost to Justine Henin; while Scoville Jenkins lost to Roger Federer, 6–3, 6–2, 6–4. Home favourite Ahsha Rolle took a 6–4, 1–6, 6–2 dramatic upset win over Tatiana Golovin in three sets. Donald Young also advanced and thus won his first ever US Open match, defeating Chris Guccione, 6–7 (2), 6–3, 6–2, 6–3.
 Seeded players out: Marcos Baghdatis, Juan Carlos Ferrero, Paul-Henri Mathieu, Jarkko Nieminen, Tatiana Golovin, Mara Santangelo, Samantha Stosur

Day 2
Arnaud Clément and wildcard Wayne Odesnik were able to advance through their matches in five sets, while Lleyton Hewitt was one who easily beat his opponent. Nicole Vaidišová and Dominika Cibulková (who upset Tathiana Garbin) won their matches, while Sania Mirza was pushed and Laura Granville easily advanced. Others to win were Martina Hingis, Juan Martín del Potro, Dudi Sela, Jürgen Melzer, Pauline Paramentier and Virginie Razzano. Lastly, doubles competition began.

 Seeded players out: Ivo Karlović, Filippo Volandri, Tathiana Garbin, Daniela Hantuchová

Day 3
Past champions Justine Henin, Serena Williams, Venus Williams, Marat Safin, and Roger Federer easily advanced to round 3 (Safin advanced to round 2), while Rafael Nadal overcame severe knee pain to beat Australian wildcard Alun Jones in 4 sets in his opening match. Tim Henman, playing in his final Grand Slam, stunned the crowd by taking out No. 27 seed Dmitry Tursunov in 4 sets to advance to round 2, joined by players such as Carlos Moyà and Mikhail Youzhny. Other women to advance to round 3 include Jelena Janković, Ana Ivanovic, Lucie Šafářová, Marion Bartoli, Dinara Safina, Elena Dementieva, and local favorite Ahsha Rolle. No. 7 Fernando González lost in his opening match, causing the upset of the tournament so far.

 Seeded players out: Fernando González, Dmitry Tursunov, Potito Starace, Ai Sugiyama
 Doubles seeds out: Mara Santangelo / Paul Hanley, Cara Black / Marcin Matkowski; Wesley Moodie / Fabrice Santoro; Maria Kirilenko / Elena Vesnina

Day 4
The fourth day of action was all about the favorites, with most of them advancing. No. 2 seed Maria Sharapova was the highest seed in action on either draw, crushing her opponent Casey Dellacqua and she was joined by other former champions Andy Roddick, Martina Hingis and Svetlana Kuznetsova in the third round. Richard Gasquet withdrew from his match against Donald Young with a fever and sore throat, and Guillermo Cañas was another casualty. British favourite Andy Murray and James Blake overcame five-set thrillers to advance, while there was also a big upset in the men's doubles draw as defending champions Martin Damm and Leander Paes crashed out. Tomáš Berdych, Tommy Haas, Nikolay Davydenko, Nadia Petrova, Anna Chakvetadze, Patty Schnyder and Nicole Vaidišová were other players to advance.

 Seeded players out: Richard Gasquet (illness; withdrew), Guillermo Cañas, Katarina Srebotnik, Francesca Schiavone, Michaëlla Krajicek
 Doubles seeds out: Martin Damm / Leander Paes; Lisa Raymond / Nenad Zimonjić; Elena Likhovtseva / Tiantian Sun

Day 5
Radek Štěpánek and Novak Djokovic battled their match for hours, never letting a set go be won with a six-an eventual scoreline that Djokovic can boast of 6–7, 7–6, 5–7, 7–5, 7–6. Mardy Fish saved match points only to lose despite being a break up in the final set to Tommy Robredo and Agustín Calleri and Philipp Kohlschreiber both pulled off upsets taking out Lleyton Hewitt and Mikhail Youzhny. In the women's draw, heavy favourites Justine Henin, Jelena Janković, Ana Ivanovic and Serena and Venus Williams all advanced to the fourth round. They were joined there by Marion Bartoli, Dinara Safina and surprise victor Sybille Bammer who upset Elena Dementieva. The doubles court saw the biggest upset of the tournament when Maria Elena Camerin and Gisela Dulko beat top seeds Cara Black and Liezel Huber 1–6, 7–6(2), 6–2 after being down 6–1, 3–1.

 Seeded players out: Mikhail Youzhny, Lleyton Hewitt, Marat Safin, Jürgen Melzer, Elena Dementieva, Alona Bondarenko, Lucie Šafářová, Vera Zvonareva
 Doubles seeds out: Eric Butorac / Jamie Murray, Arnaud Clément / Michaël Llodra; Shuai Peng / Zi Yan, Cara Black / Liezel Huber; Elena Likhovtseva / Daniel Nestor

Day 6
draw included Nadia Petrova, Patty Schnyder and Martina Hingis who all lost to promising teenagers in Ágnes Szávay, Tamira Paszek and Victoria Azarenka. Shahar Pe'er also beat the thirteenth seed Nicole Vaidišová. Otherwise favourites like Andy Roddick, Anna Chakvetadze, James Blake, Nikolay Davydenko, Roger Federer, Svetlana Kuznetsova, Tomáš Berdych and Tommy Haas all went through to the fourth round. In the men's draw, there was only one upset as the last British player left in the singles draw, Andy Murray, crashed out to Lee Hyung-taik in four sets.

 Seeded players out: Andy Murray, Nicolás Almagro, Maria Sharapova, Nadia Petrova, Patty Schnyder, Nicole Vaidišová, Martina Hingis, Sania Mirza, Anabel Medina Garrigues
 Doubles seeds out: Mariusz Fyrstenberg / Marcin Matkowski, Mahesh Bhupathi / Nenad Zimonjić, František Čermák / Leoš Friedl; Květa Peschke / Martin Damm

Day 7
The men's fourth round line-up was completed and the women's quarterfinal began to take shape. Carlos Moyà, David Ferrer, Juan Mónaco, Novak Djokovic and Rafael Nadal all expectedly made it through in the men's bottom half. Ernests Gulbis became the first Latvian player to make the fourth round of the US Open when he upset eighth seed Tommy Robredo in straight sets and Juan Ignacio Chela got his first ever victory over Ivan Ljubičić. Stanislas Wawrinka also continued his run. In the first of the women's fourth round matches, Justine Henin crushed an erratic Dinara Safina, Serena and Venus Williams both beat dangerous opponents in Marion Bartoli and Ana Ivanovic and Jelena Janković needed three sets to get past Austrian Sybille Bammer before eventually prevailing 6–4, 4–6, 6–1.

 Seeded players out: Tommy Robredo, Ivan Ljubičić, David Nalbandian, Ana Ivanovic, Marion Bartoli, Dinara Safina, Sybille Bammer
 Doubles seeds out: Jeff Coetzee / Rogier Wassen, Jonathan Erlich / Andy Ram, Jonas Björkman / Max Mirnyi; Alicia Molik / Mara Santangelo, Vania King / Émilie Loit, Anabel Medina Garrigues / Virginia Ruano Pascual; Chia-Jung Chuang / Jonathan Erlich, Alicia Molik / Bob Bryan

Day 8
Home favorite James Blake was the biggest seed to fall as the quarter-final draw was completed on the women's side. Shahar Pe'er put a stop to Agnieszka Radwańska's run, but Julia Vakulenko was unable to halt Ágnes Szávay, a player who had previously never gone past the second round of a grand slam. Russians Svetlana Kuznetsova and Anna Chakvetadze progressed with relative ease. James Blake threw three match points in his thriller with Tommy Haas, unable to repeat the previous year's showing of a quarterfinal. Andy Roddick was leading when a second opponent, Tomáš Berdych, retired on him in a week. Roger Federer lost the first set but ultimately had a comfortable victory and Nikolay Davydenko progressed, still the only player on the men's side not to drop a set. In men's doubles, the top seeded Bryan brothers were upset by tenth-seeded Simon Aspelin and Julian Knowle 7–5, 6–4. It was Aspelin's first time in a Grand Slam semifinal and Knowle's second. In women's doubles, second-seeded Lisa Raymond and Samantha Stosur were shocked by sixteenth-seeded Bethanie Mattek and Sania Mirza 2–6, 7–5, 7–5.

 Seeded players out: James Blake, Tomáš Berdych (illness; retired), Agnieszka Radwańska
 Doubles seeds out: Bob Bryan / Mike Bryan; Lisa Raymond / Samantha Stosur, Tathiana Garbin / Shahar Pe'er

Day 9
Novak Djokovic needed four sets to overcome Juan Mónaco after having a match point in the third set, and set up a meeting with Carlos Moyà who beat Latvian Ernests Gulbis. Juan Ignacio Chela survived unseeded Stanislas Wawrinka in five sets to advance to the quarterfinals. Number one Justine Henin beat Serena Williams to make the women's semifinals, and in a match that ended at 1:50 a.m. local time, David Ferrer caused the biggest upset in the men's draw so far by taking out second-seeded fellow Spaniard Rafael Nadal in a thrilling four-set match.

 Seeded players out: Rafael Nadal, Juan Mónaco, Serena Williams
 Doubles seeds out: Mark Knowles / Daniel Nestor; Bethanie Mattek / Sania Mirza; Zi Yan / Mark Knowles

Day 10
The men's semifinals began to take shape as Roger Federer overcame Andy Roddick in a thrilling 7–6, 7–6, 6–2 encounter to move through to the semifinals, where he will face Russian Nikolay Davydenko who beat Tommy Haas earlier in the day, also in straight sets. In the women's draw, the semifinal line-up was complete with three matches taking the court. Anna Chakvetadze was first, cruising past Shahar Pe'er 6–4, 6–1, and will meet compatriot Svetlana Kuznetsova in the last four for a place in the final. In the women's night match, Venus Williams beat Jelena Janković in a thrilling encounter, with Venus having to come from a set down to eventually win 4–6, 6–1, 7–6.

 Seeded players out: Andy Roddick, Tommy Haas, Jelena Janković, Shahar Pe'er
 Doubles seeds out: Paul Hanley / Kevin Ullyett; Corina Morariu / Meghann Shaughnessy, Katarina Srebotnik / Ai Sugiyama

Day 11
David Ferrer continued his scintillating run, reaching his first Grand Slam semi-final by defeating Juan Ignacio Chela 6–2, 6–3, 7–5. The final men's quarterfinal didn't last much longer, with Novak Djokovic holding his nerve to beat Carlos Moyà 6–4, 7–6 (7), 6–1 and reach his third Grand Slam semi-final of the year. The mixed doubles competition was completed, with Belorussians Max Mirnyi and Victoria Azarenka overcoming Meghann Shaughnessy and Leander Paes 6–4, 7–6 (6).

 Seeded players out: Carlos Moyà, Juan Ignacio Chela
 Doubles seeds out: Ágnes Szávay / Vladimíra Uhlířová, Květa Peschke / Rennae Stubbs

Day 12
Justine Henin came through in straight sets and defeated the Williams sisters in the same tournament. Only Martina Hingis has done this. Henin and Williams battled a classic, while Anna Chakvetadze at first dominated by errors of Svetlana Kuznetsova, but then Chakvetadze had errors and Kuznetsova got by 3–6, 6–1, 6–1.

 Seeded players out: Anna Chakvetadze, Venus Williams
 Doubles seeds out: Lukáš Dlouhý / Pavel Vízner

Day 13
Justine Henin cruised to her second US Open championship, crushing Svetlana Kuznetsova 6–1, 6–3 to win the title. Esther Vergeer once again won a doubles final, this time alongside Jiske Griffioen. Shingo Kunieda and Satoshi Saida won the Wheelchair Men's Doubles final over Robin Ammerlaan and Michaël Jeremiasz. In juniors competition, Jonathan Eysseric and Jérôme Inzerillo defeated Grigor Dimitrov and Vasek Pospisil to win the title, while Ksenia Milevskaya and Urszula Radwańska dominated their final against Oksana Kalashnikova and Ksenia Lykina.

 Seeded players out: Nikolay Davydenko, David Ferrer, Svetlana Kuznetsova

Day 14
Roger Federer won for the fourth consecutive year to bring his overall Grand Slam singles titles tally to twelve.

 Seeded players out: Novak Djokovic
 Doubles seeds out: Yung-Jan Chan / Chia-Jung Chuang

Seniors

Men's singles

 Roger Federer defeated  Novak Djokovic, 7–6(7–4), 7–6(7–2), 6–4
 It was Federer's 6th title of the year, and his 51st overall. It was his 12th career Grand Slam title, and his 4th (consecutive) at the US Open.

Women's singles

 Justine Henin defeated  Svetlana Kuznetsova, 6–1, 6–3
 It was Henin's 7th title of the year, and her 36th overall. It was her 7th (and last) career Grand Slam title, and her 2nd US Open title.

Men's doubles

 Simon Aspelin /  Julian Knowle defeated  Lukáš Dlouhý /  Pavel Vízner, 7–5, 6–4
 Aspelin and Knowle both won their first Grand Slam, defeating top seeds Bob and Mike Bryan en route.

Women's doubles

 Nathalie Dechy /  Dinara Safina defeated   Chan Yung-jan /  Chuang Chia-jung, 6–4, 6–2
 Dechy and Safina played in last year's doubles finals, however, Dechy was the winner while Safina lost in the final.

Mixed doubles

 Victoria Azarenka /  Max Mirnyi defeated  Meghann Shaughnessy /  Leander Paes, 6–4, 7–6(8–6)
• It was Azarenka's 1st career Grand Slam mixed doubles title.
• It was Mirnyi's 3rd career Grand Slam mixed doubles title and his 2nd at the US Open.

Juniors

Boys' singles

 Ričardas Berankis defeated  Jerzy Janowicz, 6–3, 6–4

Girls' singles

 Kristína Kučová defeated  Urszula Radwańska, 6–3, 1–6, 7–6(4)

Boys' doubles

 Jonathan Eysseric /  Jérôme Inzerillo defeated  Grigor Dimitrov /  Vasek Pospisil, 6–2, 6–4

Girls' doubles

 Ksenia Milevskaya /  Urszula Radwańska defeated  Oksana Kalashnikova /  Ksenia Lykina, 6–1, 6–2

Wheelchair

Wheelchair men's singles

 Shingo Kunieda defeated  Robin Ammerlaan, 6–2, 6–2

Wheelchair women's singles

 Esther Vergeer defeated  Florence Gravellier, 6–3, 6–1

Wheelchair men's doubles

 Shingo Kunieda /  Satoshi Saida defeated  Robin Ammerlaan /  Michaël Jeremiasz, 6–3, 6–2

Wheelchair women's doubles

 Jiske Griffioen /  Esther Vergeer defeated  Korie Homan /  Sharon Walraven, 6–1, 6–1

Wheelchair quad singles

 Peter Norfolk def  David Wagner, 7–6(5), 6–2

Wheelchair quad doubles
 Nick Taylor /  David Wagner defeated  Sarah Hunter /  Peter Norfolk, 6–1, 4–6, 6–0

Legends

Men's champions invitational

 Todd Martin

Women's champions invitational

 Conchita Martínez and  Jana Novotná

Mixed champions invitational

Round robin 1:  Natasha Zvereva /  Andrés Gómez
Round robin 2:  Anne Smith /  Stan Smith

Seeds
The seeded players are listed below. Notably, it was the first time in 11 years that the two top seeded players, and the two world number one singles players, won the US Open Singles Championships (the last previous time had been when Pete Sampras and Steffi Graf won in 1996).

Men's singles
  Roger Federer (champion)
  Rafael Nadal (4th round, lost to David Ferrer)
  Novak Djokovic, (finals, lost to Roger Federer)
  Nikolay Davydenko, (semifinals, lost to Roger Federer)
  Andy Roddick, (quarterfinals, lost to Roger Federer)
  James Blake, (4th round, lost to Tommy Haas)
  Fernando González, (1st round, lost to Teymuraz Gabashvili)
  Tommy Robredo, (3rd round, lost to Ernests Gulbis)
  Tomáš Berdych, (4th round, retired to Andy Roddick)
  Tommy Haas, (quarterfinals, lost to Nikolay Davydenko)
  Mikhail Youzhny, (2nd round, lost to Philipp Kohlschreiber)
  Ivan Ljubičić, (3rd round, lost to Juan Ignacio Chela)
  Richard Gasquet, (2nd round, lost by walkover to Donald Young)
  Guillermo Cañas, (2nd round, lost to Lee Hyung-taik)
  David Ferrer, (semifinals, lost to Novak Djokovic)
  Lleyton Hewitt, (2nd round, lost to Agustín Calleri)
  Carlos Moyà, (quarterfinals, lost to Novak Djokovic)
  Marcos Baghdatis, (1st round, lost to Max Mirnyi)
  Andy Murray, (3rd round, lost to Lee Hyung-taik)
  Juan Ignacio Chela, (quarterfinals, lost to David Ferrer)
  Juan Carlos Ferrero, (1st round, lost to Feliciano López)
  Paul-Henri Mathieu, (1st round, lost to Fernando Verdasco)
  Juan Mónaco, (4th round, lost to Novak Djokovic)
  David Nalbandian, (3rd round, lost to David Ferrer)
  Marat Safin, (2nd round, lost to Stanislas Wawrinka)
  Jarkko Nieminen, (1st round, lost to John Isner)
  Dmitry Tursunov, (1st round, lost to Tim Henman)
  Nicolás Almagro, (3rd round, lost to Nikolay Davydenko)
  Filippo Volandri, (1st round, lost to Michaël Llodra)
  Potito Starace, (1st round, lost to Ernests Gulbis)
  Jürgen Melzer, (2nd round, lost to Juan Martín del Potro)
  Ivo Karlović, (1st round, lost to Arnaud Clément)

Women's singles
  Justine Henin (champion)
  Maria Sharapova (defending champion, 3rd round, lost to Agnieszka Radwańska)
  Jelena Janković, (quarterfinals, lost to Venus Williams)
  Svetlana Kuznetsova, (finals, lost to Justine Henin)
  Ana Ivanovic, (4th round, lost to Venus Williams)
  Anna Chakvetadze, (semifinals, lost to Svetlana Kuznetsova)
  Nadia Petrova, (3rd round, lost to Ágnes Szávay)
  Serena Williams, (quarterfinals, lost to Justine Henin)
  Daniela Hantuchová, (1st round, lost to Julia Vakulenko)
  Marion Bartoli, (4th round, lost to Serena Williams)
  Patty Schnyder, (3rd round, lost to Tamira Paszek)
  Venus Williams (semifinals, lost to Justine Henin)
  Nicole Vaidišová, (3rd round, lost to Shahar Pe'er)
  Elena Dementieva, (3rd round, lost to Sybille Bammer)
  Dinara Safina, (4th round, lost to Justine Henin)
  Martina Hingis, (3rd round, lost to Victoria Azarenka)
  Tatiana Golovin, (1st round, lost to Ahsha Rolle)
  Shahar Pe'er, (quarterfinals, lost to Anna Chakvetadze)
  Sybille Bammer, (4th round, lost to Jelena Janković)
  Lucie Šafářová, (3rd round, lost to Marion Bartoli)
  Alona Bondarenko, (3rd round, lost to Venus Williams)
  Katarina Srebotnik, (2nd round, lost to Maria Kirilenko)
  Tathiana Garbin, (1st round, lost to Dominika Cibulková)
  Francesca Schiavone, (2nd round, lost to Tamira Paszek)
  Mara Santangelo, (1st round, lost to Vera Dushevina)
  Sania Mirza, (3rd round, lost to Anna Chakvetadze)
  Vera Zvonareva, (3rd round, lost to Serena Williams)
  Ai Sugiyama, (2nd round, lost to Ekaterina Makarova)
  Samantha Stosur, (1st round, lost to Alizé Cornet)
  Agnieszka Radwańska, (4th round, lost to Shahar Pe'er)
  Anabel Medina Garrigues, (3rd round, lost to Svetlana Kuznetsova)
  Michaëlla Krajicek, (2nd round, lost to Ágnes Szávay)

Wild card entries
Below are the lists of the wild card awardees entering in the main draws.

Men's singles
  John Isner
  Alun Jones
  Alex Kuznetsov
  Jesse Levine
  Michael McClune
  Wayne Odesnik
  Ryan Sweeting
  Donald Young

Women's singles
  Lauren Albanese
  Madison Brengle
  Audra Cohen
  Alexa Glatch
  Jamea Jackson
  Jessica Moore
  Ahsha Rolle
  Ashley Weinhold

Men's doubles
  Kellen Damico /  Nathaniel Schnugg
  Robby Ginepri /  Gustavo Kuerten
  John Isner /  Scott Oudsema
  Scoville Jenkins /  Phillip Simmonds
  Robert Kendrick /  Sam Querrey
  Alex Kuznetsov /  Jesse Levine
  Rajeev Ram /  Donald Young

Women's' doubles
  Sara Anundsen /  Jenna Long
  Hilary Barte /  Alexandra Mueller
  Madison Brengle /  Ashley Weinhold
  Alexa Glatch /  Abigail Spears
  Jamie Hampton /  Melanie Oudin
  Angela Haynes /  Ahsha Rolle
  Jamea Jackson /  Chanda Rubin

Mixed doubles
  Jill Craybas /  Bobby Reynolds
  Alexa Glatch /  Scoville Jenkins
  Ashley Harkleroad /  Justin Gimelstob
  Vania King /  Vince Spadea
  Corina Morariu /  Amer Delić
  Ashley Weinhold /  Ryan Sweeting

Qualifier entries

Men's Singles

  Frank Dancevic 
  Bruno Echagaray 
  Andrei Pavel 
  Alexander Waske 
  Steve Darcis 
  Scoville Jenkins 
  Rainer Schüttler 
  Pablo Cuevas 
  Rik de Voest 
  Dominik Meffert 
  Dudi Sela 
  Björn Phau 
  Paul Capdeville 
  Thierry Ascione 
  Philipp Petzschner 
  Michał Przysiężny

The following players received entry as lucky losers:
  Bobby Reynolds
  Robin Haase 

Women's Singles

  Tatiana Perebiynis
  Yan Zi
  Alizé Cornet 
  Petra Cetkovská
  Alina Jidkova 
  Julia Görges
  Pauline Parmentier 
  Olivia Sanchez 
  Andreja Klepač 
  Emmanuelle Gagliardi
  Sandra Klösel
  Jorgelina Cravero 
  Kira Nagy
  Ekaterina Makarova
  Renata Voráčová 
  Tsvetana Pironkova

Protected ranking
The following players were accepted directly into the main draw using a protected ranking: 

Men's Singles
  Justin Gimelstob
  Nicolas Kiefer

Women's Singles
  Cho Yoon-jeong

Withdrawals

Men's singles
 Mario Ančić → replaced by  Robin Haase
 Joachim Johansson → replaced by  Nicolas Devilder
 Gaël Monfils → replaced by  Bobby Reynolds
 Robin Söderling → replaced by  Danai Udomchoke
 Paradorn Srichaphan → replaced by  Robert Kendrick

Women's singles
 Vasilisa Bardina → replaced by  Cho Yoon-jeong
 Li Na → replaced by  Mathilde Johansson
 Amélie Mauresmo → replaced by  Olga Govortsova
 Milagros Sequera → replaced by  Julia Schruff
 Zheng Jie → replaced by  Andrea Petkovic

Media coverage
Coverage of the 2007 US Open are as follows:

Television networks

 Australia – Fox Sports (live)
 Australia – Nine Network (finals only)
 Bosnia and Herzegovina – BHRT (all live)
 Brazil – ESPN Latin America, ESPN Brasil and SporTV2 (all live)
 China – China Central Television (live)
 Europe – Eurosport (live)
 Middle East – ART Sports (live)
 India – TEN Sports (live)
 Latin America – ESPN Latin America, ESPN Más and ESPN Dos (all live)
 Pakistan – STAR Sports (live)
 Philippines – Balls (live; began test broadcast)
 Serbia – RTS (live)
 Singapore – SuperSports (live)
 United Kingdom – British Eurosport (live)
 United Kingdom – Sky Sports (live)
 United States – CBS Sports (live)
 United States – CNBC (Monday night, September 3 Only)
 United States – Universal HD (live, HD Simulcast of USA Network and CNBC)
 United States – USA Network (live)

Radio
 Canada – XM Sports Nation
 United Kingdom – BBC Radio 5Live
 United States – XM Sports Nation

References

External links

 Official website of US Open
 Archived results on SI.com

 
 

 
US Open (tennis)
U.S. Open
US Open
US Open (tennis) by year
US Open
US Open
US Open